My Lady's Garter is a lost 1920 American silent mystery film directed by Maurice Tourneur and starring Wyndham Standing, Sylvia Breamer and Holmes Herbert. It was based on the 1912 novel of the same name by Jacques Futrelle, a writer who perished with the sinking of the Titanic in 1912.

Plot
As described in a film magazine, a jeweled garter with an interesting history disappears under mysterious circumstances from the British Museum. The Hawk, a criminal who has never been apprehended even though he obligingly leaves many clues for the police to follow, is suspected. Helen Hamilton (Breamer), daughter of a wealthy American, loses her jewels after throwing them out of a window at Keats Gaunt (Craig), a poet she imagines she is in love with. A tiff with Gaunt follows and she dives into the sea, being rescued by a strange gentleman in a yacht who gives his name as Bruce Calhoun (Standing).  English detectives suspect him of the robbery and watch him closely. He goes to Helen's home and becomes acquainted with her family, but his mysterious actions raise doubts in the minds of all save Helen, who now loves him. Not even to her, however, will he admit his part in the mysterious proceedings that are occurring continuously until, by a master stroke, he catches the criminal, a rival for Helen's affections, and then reveals that he is an American secret service man and worthy of her love.

Cast
 Wyndham Standing as Bruce Calhoun 
 Sylvia Breamer as Helen Hamilton 
 Holmes Herbert as Henry Van Derp, aka The Hawk 
 Warner Richmond as Meredith 
 Paul Clerget as Dexter 
 Warren Cook as Brokaw Hamilton 
 Louise de Rigney as Mrs. Hamilton 
 Charles Craig as Keats Gaunt

Bibliography
 Waldman, Harry. Maurice Tourneur: The Life and Films. McFarland, 2008.

References

External links

Broadway play version of My Lady's Garter, 1915; IBDb.com

1920 films
1920 drama films
American silent feature films
American mystery drama films
American black-and-white films
Famous Players-Lasky films
Films based on American novels
Films directed by Maurice Tourneur
Films set in London
Films set in England
Lost American films
1920s mystery drama films
1920s English-language films
1920s American films
Silent American drama films
Silent mystery drama films